Philipp Petzschner was the defending champion, but withdrew before the tournament.

Jürgen Melzer defeated Marin Čilić in the final 6–4, 6–3 in his hometown of Vienna.

Seeds

Draw

Finals

Top half

Bottom half

External links
 Main Draw
 Qualifying Draw

Bank Austria-TennisTrophy - Singles